J. Carlyle "Duke" Dinsmore (April 10, 1913 – October 13, 1985) was an American racecar driver.

Complete AAA/USAC Championship Car results

Indianapolis 500 results

* Shared drive with Rodger Ward and Andy Linden.  Dinsmore drove ten laps of the 177 completed by Ward (138), Linden (29) and Dinsmore.

Complete Formula One World Championship results
(key)

 * Indicates shared drive with Rodger Ward and Andy Linden.

References

External links
Duke Dinsmore sharing his Milwaukee memories

1913 births
1985 deaths
People from Williamstown, West Virginia
Racing drivers from West Virginia
Indianapolis 500 drivers
AAA Championship Car drivers